NASASpaceflight.com is a private news website and forum which launched in 2005, covering crewed and uncrewed spaceflight and aerospace engineering news. Its original reporting has been referenced by various news outlets on spaceflight-specific news, such as MSNBC, USA Today and The New York Times among others. NASASpaceflight also produces videos and live streams of rocket launches online, with a special focus on developments at SpaceX's Starbase facility, for which they were recognized with an award by SpaceNews. NSF is owned and operated by managing editor Chris Bergin and content is produced by a team of spaceflight reporters, journalists, contributors, editors, photographers, and videographers across the United States and other countries.

NASASpaceflight and NASASpaceflight.com are not affliated with NASA .

References 

Websites related to spaceflight
Science podcasts
Space advocacy
Internet forums

External Links 
 Official NASASpaceflight Website
 Official NASASpaceflight Forum
 NASASpaceflight Facebook page
 NASASpaceflight Twitter page
 NASASpaceflight Instagram page
 NASASpaceflight YouTube page